Hokkaidō 1st district (北海道[第]1区, Hokkaidō-[dai-]ikku) is a single-member constituency of the House of Representatives, the lower house of the national Diet of Japan. It is located in Sapporo, the prefectural capital of Hokkaido.  In 2015, 493,140 eligible voters were registered in the district, giving it the lowest electoral weight in Hokkaidō. In 2017, its border were redrawn and it now consists of Sapporo's Chūō ("Centre") and Minami ("South") wards, a portion of Nishi ("West") ward as well as a small part of Kita ("North") ward.

Since 2017, the district has been represented by Daiki Michishita of the CDP. This seat was almost continuously held by former Hokkaidō governor Takahiro Yokomichi between 1996 and 2017, except for a brief period from 2012 to 2014. Yokomichi was the leader of the ex-Socialist faction within the Democratic Party and Speaker of the House of Representatives from 2009 to 2012. Before the 1994 House of Representatives electoral reform, Sapporo city had been part of the six-member 1st district that covered Ishikari and Shiribetsu subprefectures. Yokomichi and previously his father Setsuo had represented the pre-reform multi-member 1st district for the Socialists from 1952 until the 1983 gubernatorial election, interrupted by two years after Setsuo Yokomichi's death in 1967. In the 2009 general election, Yokomichi's main challenger was LDP's Gaku Hasegawa, who lost the race and also failed to win a proportional seat, but went on to become Councillor for Hokkaidō in 2010. In 2005, Muneo Suzuki's regionalist New Party Daichi nominated ski jumper Masahiro Akimoto in the district. In 2000, former Olympic weightlifter and current Hokkaidō assemblyman Nobuyuki Hatta ran unsuccessfully as a candidate for Ichirō Ozawa's Liberal Party. In 2012, Olympic speed skater Hiroyasu Shimizu ran for the district as a member of the New Party Daichi – True Democrats. Yokomichi lost the seat in the 2012 election to Toshimitsu Funahashi of the LDP but regained it in 2014. He stepped down in 2017.

List of representatives

Election results

Footnotes

References 

Politics of Hokkaido
Districts of the House of Representatives (Japan)